Huguette Peeters (born 27 November 1936) is a Belgian former freestyle swimmer. She competed in two events at the 1952 Summer Olympics.

References

External links
 

1936 births
Living people
Belgian female freestyle swimmers
Olympic swimmers of Belgium
Swimmers at the 1952 Summer Olympics
Place of birth missing (living people)